Azmir Ahmed (born 14 November 1995) is a Bangladeshi cricketer. He made his List A debut on 30 March 2017 against Pakistan U-23 in the 2017 ACC Emerging Teams Asia Cup. He made his first-class debut for Dhaka Metropolis in the 2018–19 National Cricket League on 5 November 2018. He made his Twenty20 debut for Legends of Rupganj in the 2018–19 Dhaka Premier Division Twenty20 Cricket League on 27 February 2019.

References

External links
 

1995 births
Living people
Bangladeshi cricketers
Dhaka Metropolis cricketers
Legends of Rupganj cricketers
Cricketers from Dhaka